Varieté is the fifteenth studio album by the British singer/songwriter Marc Almond. It was released on 7 June 2010 through Strike Force Entertainment, part of Cherry Red Records.

Background

Varieté marks Almond's 30th year as a recording artist. It is his first album of original material in nine years. At the time of its release, Almond himself stated it would be his final album of original material as he had increasingly become more interested in recording pre-existing songs (as many of his covers albums have showcased), but this would prove to be untrue and he went on to record further original material afterwards. Much of it is self-produced and co-written with longtime collaborators Neal Whitmore and Martin Watkins.

The album was released in a standard one-disc jewel case and a limited edition two-disc digipak in a slip-sleeve version, featuring seven bonus tracks on the second disc.

Critical reception

Varieté received mixed reviews from critics. The Guardian described a "nostalgic mood" but saw the album as "furrows already ploughed". The Daily Telegraph wrote about Almond's lyrics, stating that "his lyrical pen remains hilariously barbed", and called the album "self-composed cabaret sleaze". The review in The Scotsman agreed that Almond is looking back with this album, returning "to old themes with alacrity", and summarised by calling Varieté "mischievous, lightweight fun compared to Almond's darker, more tortured journeys into European chanson". Simon Price in his review from The Independent called the album "an autobiography and also a hymn to the underground" and stated that Almond "is determined to squeeze life for its every last drop". The AllMusic review praised the production as flowing "freely from spare, late-night-in-the-cocktail-lounge settings to big, bold, orchestral statements". It also had further commentary on the bonus tracks available with the limited edition version of the album, stating that the "more minimal, acoustic-based" songs shine "a brighter light on Almond's songwriting abilities".

Track listing

 "(Intro)" (Marc Almond, Michael Cashmore) – 0:42
 "Bread & Circus" (Almond, Alexei Fedorov) – 3:47
 "Nijinsky Heart" (Almond, Roland Faber) – 3:59
 "The Exhibitionist" (Almond, Martin Watkins) – 4:44
 "The Trials of Eyeliner" (Almond, Michael Cashmore) – 5:44 
 "Lavender" (Almond, Watkins) – 5:25
 "Soho So Long" (Almond, Fedorov, Neal Whitmore) – 3:37
 "Unloveable" (Almond, Faber) – 2:47
 "Sandboy" (Almond, Watkins) – 4:41
 "It's All Going On" (Almond, Faber) – 4:32
 "Variety" (Almond, Faber) – 3:31
 "Cabaret Clown" (Almond) – 3:09
 "My Madness and I" (Almond, Whitmore) – 4:34
 "But Not Today" (Almond, Whitmore) – 4:29
 "Swan Song" (Almond, Whitmore) – 3:41
 "Sin Song" (Almond, Cashmore) – 7:03

Bonus acoustic disc (Limited edition)

 "My Evil Twin" (Almond, Faber) – 3:13
 "A Lonely Love" (Almond) – 3:35
 "Cat Dancer" (Almond, Whitmore) – 2:23
 "Criminal Lover" (Almond, Whitmore) – 3:17
 "I Am No One" (Almond, Whitmore) – 2:35
 "Smoke" (Almond, Whitmore) – 3:11
 "Kiss the Ghost (Goodbye)" (Almond) – 4:45

Personnel

Marc Almond – vocals, arrangement
Neal Whitmore – electric and acoustic guitar, ukulele, piano, harmonica, Omnichord, arrangement
Martin Watkins – piano, keyboards, Omnichord, arrangement
Dave Ruffy – drums, percussion, bongos, spoons, drum machine
Carl Holt – electric and acoustic bass

Guest musicians
Armen Ra – theremin
David Coulter – musical saw
Andy Marlowe – additional guitar
Roland Faber – Moog, analogue synths, simulated Martenot, Mellotron
Seamus Beaghen - Hammond organ
Thomas Bowles – clarinet
Igor Outkine (from band Mazaika) – Bayan accordion
Sarah Harrison (from band Mazaika) – violin
Gemma Rosefield – cello
Daisy Gathorne-Hardy – cello
Sarah McMahon – cello
Maria Martinez – cello
Debs White – violin
Tamsin Waley-Cohen – violin
Tom Hankey – viola
James Knight – saxophone
Dominic Glover – trumpet
Nichol Thomson – trombone
Richard Shaw – cornet
Lucy Jackson – cornet
Tracy Colston – tenor horn
Jonathon Ford – Euphonium
Tris Penna – string synthesizer

References

2010 albums
Marc Almond albums
Cherry Red Records albums